The following is a list of squads for each nation who competed at the 2013 OSN Cup in Saudi Arabia from 5 to 9 September 2013. Each squad consisted of  players,  of which had to be goalkeepers. Replacement of injured players was permitted until 24 hours before the team's game. Players marked (c) were named as captain for their national team.

Squads are as of 5 September 2013 15:00 GMT

New Zealand
Head coach: Ricki Herbert

Saudi Arabia
Head coach:  Juan Ramón López Caro

Trinidad and Tobago
Head coach: Stephen Hart

United Arab Emirates
Head coach: Mahdi Ali

Player representation

By club nationality 

Nations in italics are not represented by their national teams in the finals.

By representatives of domestic league

References

2013 OSN Cup